Cisco Oil Field is an oil field located in Grand County, Utah. The field was discovered in 1924 in the now abandoned town of Cisco, Utah.  It is one of the oldest oil fields in the state of Utah. The field has been developed intermittently since then with the discovery of several small accumulations of oil. The field lies along a larger feature known as the Uncompahgre Uplift that is a boundary between Paradox Basin, the Uintah Basin and the Piceance Basin.

The field is actually a series of localized oil accumulations that produce from several different channel sands in the Mancos, Cedar Mountain, Dakota, Saltwash and Brushy Basin zones (Morgan, 1999 and 2001). Natural gas and Oil is produced from the Mancos, Cedar Mountain and Dakota formations, while the Brushy Basin and Saltwash production is mostly crude oil. 

The productive reservoirs are either structurally controlled by Horst and Graben features or isolated stratigraphic traps related to either lithological or permeability pinch outs (Tedesco, 2013). The field is along to Cotton Creek Anticline (Morgan, 1999). The depth for production ranges from 900 to over 2,000 feet. The field straddles the I-70 highway between Moab and Grand Junction.

The oil is both derived locally as in the Mancos, Cedar Mountain and Dakota sandstones from the adjacent Dakota shale. The oil in these reservoirs is typically a moderate to light green color. The oil found in the Saltwash and Brushy Basin reservoirs contain a heavier black oil that is Pennsylvanian in age and has migrated from the adjacent Paradox Basin.

References 
Morgan C.D., 1999, Petroleum geology of the Cisco Townsite and Cisco Wash Areas, Grand County, Utah, Utah Geological Survey, Oil and Gas Field Study 22

Morgan C.D., 2001, Petroleum geology of the Agate, Danish Wash, Sage, and Seiber nose reservoirs in the Greater Cisco Field Area, Utah Geological Survey, Field Study 23

Tedesco, S. A., 2013, Geology and seismic interpretation of the Cisco Springs area, Uncompahgre Uplift, Grand County, Utah, AAPG Rocky Mountain Section 62nd Annual Meeting, Salt Lake City, UT September 22–24, 2013, Search and Discovery Article 90169.

Geography of Grand County, Utah
Oil fields in Utah
Buildings and structures in Grand County, Utah